David Lamason (born 23 April 1971) is a New Zealand cricketer. He played in 5 first-class and 22 List A matches for Central Districts from 1990 to 1997.

See also
 List of Central Districts representative cricketers

References

External links
 

1971 births
Living people
New Zealand cricketers
Central Districts cricketers
Cricketers from Whanganui